Last Waltz in Vienna by George Clare (21 December 1920 – 26 March  2009) was the 1982 winner of The WH Smith Literary Award.

The book, subtitled The Destruction of a Family 1842–1942, tells the history and fate of the Klaar family, who were proudly Austrian and also happened to be Jewish.

The family left Austria following the Anschluss. After the fall of France, Clare's parents were arrested in 1942 by the Vichy authorities and deported from the Drancy internment camp to Auschwitz where they were murdered.

The author changed his name while serving as a volunteer in the British Army in World War II, first in the Pioneer Corps and later the Royal Artillery, and chose George Clare, as an anglicised version of his original name, Georg Klaar.

The book was translated into six languages and was the subject of a BBC Television documentary.

References

1982 non-fiction books
World War II memoirs
Jews and Judaism in Austria